This is a tabulated listing of the orders of magnitude in relation to pressure expressed in pascals.

References

Units of pressure
Pressure